The Aotearoa New Zealand Tertiary Chaplaincy Association (ANZTCA) is a national organization  representing tertiary chaplains in New Zealand. Tertiary chaplains generally provide religious counselling and educational services within tertiary institutions, and membership of the ANZTCA is open to chaplains of any religion. The association provides a code of ethics for chaplains as well an annual conference to encourage networking and professional development.

References

External links 
 Aotearoa New Zealand Tertiary Chaplaincy Association Website

Student religious organisations in New Zealand